Events in the year 1868 in Belgium.

Incumbents
Monarch: Leopold II
Head of government: Charles Rogier (to 3 January); Walthère Frère-Orban (from 3 January)

Events
January
 3 January – Walthère Frère-Orban replaces Charles Rogier as Prime Minister
 28 January – Victor-Auguste-Isidor Deschamps enthroned as Archbishop of Mechelen.

March
 1 March – Société Libre des Beaux-Arts founded.
 24 March – 20 killed when soldiers shoot on striking miners from the Epine mine in Dampremy.

May
 25 May – Provincial elections

June
 9 June – Partial legislative elections of 1868

August
 6 August – 47 miners killed by a fire damp explosion in the Sainte Henriette mine near Jemappes.

September
 7 September – Third international workers congress opens in Brussels.

October
 23 October – Frederick Doulton, MP, brought to trial in Brussels on charges of fraud in public works, but acquitted of having broken any law.

Publications
Periodicals
Almanach royal officiel (Brussels, E. Guyot)
 Collection de précis historiques, vol. 17, edited by Edouard Terwecoren S.J.
 Socialist daily newspaper De Werker launched in Antwerp (October).

Series
 Biographie Nationale de Belgique, vol. 2

History
 Charles Niellon, Histoire des événements militaires et des conspirations orangistes de la révolution en Belgique de 1830 à 1833 (Brussels, M.J. Poot)

Literature
 Maria Doolaeghe, Winterbloemen

Art and architecture

 Société Libre des Beaux-Arts founded

Paintings
 Charles-Philogène Tschaggeny, The Covered Wagon

Sculptures
 Louis Jehotte's equestrian statue of Charlemagne inaugurated in Liège

Births
 11 January – François Ruhlmann, conductor (died 1948)
 5 February – Lodewijk Mortelmans, composer (died 1952)
 23 February – Paul Bergmans, librarian (died 1935)
 5 March – Prosper Poullet, politician (died 1937)
 27 April – Herman Vander Linden, politician (died 1956)
 18 June — Anna Kernkamp, artist (died 1947)
 23 August – Paul Otlet, bibliographer (died 1944)
 15 November – Marguerite Putsage, painter (died 1946)
 28 November – Louis Franck, politician (died 1937)

Deaths
 17 April – Guillaume-Hippolyte van Volxem  (born 1791), politician
 30 April – Charles Le Hon (born 1792), politician
 9 July – Toussaint-Henry-Joseph Fafchamps (born 1783), military inventor
 21 July – Édouard Ducpétiaux (born 1804), prison reformer

References

 
Belgium
Years of the 19th century in Belgium
1860s in Belgium
Belgium